Tshaka Cunningham is the Chief Scientific Officer of TruGenomix, a company focused on diagnosis and treatment for individuals with behavioral health conditions, and Executive Director of the Faith Based Genetics Research Institute.

Early life and education 
Growing up in Washington D.C., Cunningham was introduced to science  by his grandmother, Alfreda DeGraff Simmons, who was a scientist at the National Cancer Institute and the Walter Reed National Military Medical Center in Bethesda, M.D. 

In 1991, Cunningham was named a top 10 award recipient from Project Excellence founded by Carl T. Rowan. He graduated with a BA in molecular biology from Princeton University. He then pursued a doctoral degree in molecular biology from The Rockefeller University and received a Merck Fellowship to pursue research in HIV biology. His doctoral thesis was  "Exploring the Early Events in the HIV-1 Life Cycle: From Post-Entry Restriction to Nuclear Import". He graduated in 2005 and had  postdoctoral training in immunology and tumor immunotherapy at the Pasteur Institute and the National Institutes of Health in Bethesda, M.D.

Career 
Cunningham started his career as a research scientist at Bristol-Myers Squibb Pharmaceuticals Inc., where he worked on development of assays to identify drugs for cardiovascular diseases. He later served as a Scientific Program Manager in the Aging and Neurodegenerative Diseases Rehabilitation Research Program at the United States Department of Veterans Affairs's   Veterans Health Administration’s Office of Research & Development (VHA ORD). He also was an advisor to the VHA ORD Genomic Medicine Implementation Program and convened the Million Veteran Program-Diversity Working Group. He created the VA’s Historically Black College and University Research Scientist Training Program (VA HBCU-RSTP), the major diversity outreach initiative sponsored by VHA ORD. Prior to his current role as the Chief Scientific Officer of TruGenomix, he was the Associate Director of Scientific Collaboration for DIA Global.

Cunningham is a founding member and Executive Director of the Faith Based Genomic Research Institute. The institute works to build trust between the medical community and communities of color to highlight the value of genomic research, gene editing and gene therapy.  He   He also served as a deacon at the historic Alfred Street Baptist Church.

In 2011, Cunningham was honored by the Northern Virginia Urban League for his accomplishments in science and his role in the community.

Most-cited Publications
Cowan S, Hatziioannou T, Cunningham T, Muesing MA, Gottlinger HG, Bieniasz PD. Cellular inhibitors with Fv1-like activity restrict human and simian immunodeficiency virus tropism. Proceedings of the National Academy of Sciences. 2002 Sep 3;99(18):11914-9. (Cited 364 times, according to Google Scholar  ) 
Zhu Q, Talton J, Zhang G, Cunningham T, Wang Z, Waters RC, Kirk J, Eppler B, Klinman DM, Sui Y, Gagnon S. Large intestine–targeted, nanoparticle-releasing oral vaccine to control genitorectal viral infection. Nature medicine. 2012 Aug;18(8):1291-6. (Cited 143 times, according to Google Scholar. )  
Shrivastav S, Kino T, Cunningham T, Ichijo T, Schubert U, Heinklein P, Chrousos GP, Kopp JB. Human immunodeficiency virus (HIV)-1 viral protein R suppresses transcriptional activity of peroxisome proliferator-activated receptor γ and inhibits adipocyte differentiation: implications for HIV-associated lipodystrophy. Molecular Endocrinology. 2008 Feb 1;22(2):234-47. (Cited 93 times, according to Google Scholar. )  
Dolan BP, Sharma AA, Gibbs JS, Cunningham TJ, Bennink JR, Yewdell JW. MHC class I antigen processing distinguishes endogenous antigens based on their translation from cellular vs. viral mRNA. Proceedings of the National Academy of Sciences. 2012 May 1;109(18):7025-30. (Cited 43 times, according to Google Scholar. )

References 

Princeton University alumni
Rockefeller University alumni
Year of birth missing (living people)
Living people